Jérôme Moïso (born 15 June 1978) is a French former professional basketball player.

College career
He played college basketball at UCLA with the UCLA Bruins.

Professional career
A forward-center who has played in the NBA, Moïso was selected 11th overall in the 2000 NBA draft  by the Celtics in 2000, and has played for the NBA clubs the Boston Celtics, Charlotte Hornets, New Orleans Hornets, Toronto Raptors, New Jersey Nets and Cleveland Cavaliers.  In total, Moïso played 145 games in his NBA career, starting in 3 of them, with averages of 2.7 points and 2.7 rebounds. His best season came in 2002-03 when he established career highs in points per game (4.0) and rebounds per game (3.5) for the New Orleans Hornets.

He would end his NBA career as a Cavalier, only playing 4 games for the team. Moïso's final NBA game was played on February 16, 2005, in a 111–89 win over the Atlanta Hawks, where he recorded only 2 points and 1 rebound.

He has also played in Europe with the Italian League clubs Lottomatica Roma and Climamio Bologna, the Spanish ACB League clubs Real Madrid, DKV Joventut, and Bilbao Basket, and the Russian Super League club Khimki BC.

References

External links 
 
Eurocup Player Profile
Complete stats
UCLA Bruins profile

1978 births
Living people
BC Dnipro players
BC Khimki players
Bilbao Basket players
Black French sportspeople
Boston Celtics draft picks
Boston Celtics players
Centers (basketball)
Centre Fédéral de Basket-ball players
Charlotte Hornets players
Cleveland Cavaliers players
Fortitudo Pallacanestro Bologna players
French expatriate basketball people in Canada
French expatriate basketball people in Italy
French expatriate basketball people in Spain
French expatriate basketball people in the United States
French expatriate sportspeople in China
French men's basketball players
French people of Guadeloupean descent
Jiangsu Dragons players
Joventut Badalona players
Lega Basket Serie A players
Liga ACB players
Milford Academy alumni
National Basketball Association players from France
New Jersey Nets players
New Orleans Hornets players
Pallacanestro Virtus Roma players
Piratas de Quebradillas players
Power forwards (basketball)
Real Madrid Baloncesto players
Basketball players from Paris
Toronto Raptors players
UCLA Bruins men's basketball players